Netherlands Antilles competed at the 2009 World Championships in Athletics from 15–23 August. A team of 2 athletes was announced in preparation for the competition.

Team selection
Track and road events

Results

Men

References
Entry list. European Athletic Association (2009-07-30). Retrieved on 2009-08-16.

External links
Official competition website

Nations at the 2009 World Championships in Athletics
World Championships in Athletics
Athletics in the Netherlands Antilles
Netherlands Antilles at the World Championships in Athletics